Arvo Antonovich Mets (29 April 1937 – 1997) was an Estonian-born Russian poet. He is regarded as a master of Russian free verse. He also translated works of Estonian poets into Russian.

Biography 
Arvo Mets was born in Tallinn to an Estonian Orthodox father and a Lutheran mother. Although neither of his parents spoke Russian, he was able to learn the language on his own. He was educated at the Leningrad Library Institute and later at the Maxim Gorky Literature Institute in Moscow. He lived most of his life in Moscow where he edited a few literary magazines. From 1975 till 1991 he worked as an editor for the “New world” magazine (rus. “Новый мир”). Arvo Mets organised poetry reading in the “Taganka” literary club (rus. “На Таганке”). During his lifetime he published four collections of his poems. The book of his selected poems appeared posthumously, in 2006. His works also appeared in the best Russian literary magazines. A number of his poems have been translated into English, Dutch, Hindi, Serbian and other languages.

His complete poems appeared 2021 in Swedish translation by Alan Asaid: Tallinns stenar. Samlade dikter 1962–1996 (Bokförlaget Faethon).

A Sample Poem by Arvo Mets 
Resemblance

Young girls
resemble in looks
the sky,
the wind,
the clouds above.

Later these girls make
devoted wives
whose faces remind us
of houses,
furniture,
carrier bags.

Still, their daughters
resemble in looks
the sky, 
the wind
and streamlets in spring.

(translated by Anatoly Kudryavitsky)

Sources

Books 
 “Swans above Chelny” (an anthology of poems by the members of the “Orpheus” writers group from Naberezhnye Chelny), Moscow, Proceedings Publishers, 1981 (79 pages).
 “Stones of Tallinn”, Moscow, Proceedings Publishers, 1989
 “Annual Rings”, Moscow, Author Publishers, 1992
 “Poems”, Moscow, The State Museum of V. Sidur, 1995
 “In the Forests of Autumn”, Moscow, 2006, no publisher's name, series “Russian verse libre” (276 pages) [ISBN 9789189113572]
Tallinns stenar. Samlade dikter 1962–1996 [Stones of Tallinn. Complete poems 1962–1996], translated from Russian into Swedish by Alan Asaid, with commentaries and afterword by the translator, Stockholm, Bokförlaget Faethon, 2021 (271 pages).

Texts in anthologies 
 “X-Time”, Moscow, 1989
 “The Anthology of Russian Verse Libre”, Moscow, 1991
 "A Night in the Nabokov Hotel: 20 contemporary poets from Russia", Dedalus Press, Dublin, 2006.

On the Web 
 Poems of Arvo Mets in English

1937 births
1997 deaths
Russian male poets
People from Tallinn
Russian people of Estonian descent
20th-century Russian translators
20th-century Russian poets
20th-century Russian male writers
Maxim Gorky Literature Institute alumni
Saint-Petersburg State University of Culture and Arts alumni